Ronald Whitney is the name of

 Ron Whitney (born 1942), American hurdler
 Ronald Whitney (politician), Member of the Massachusetts House of Representatives 1995–1997